In 1999, the Major League Baseball All-Century Team was chosen by popular vote of fans. To select the team, a panel of experts first compiled a list of the 100 greatest Major League Baseball (MLB) players from the 20th century. Over two million fans then voted on the players using paper and online ballots.

The top two vote-getters from each position, except outfielders (nine), and the top six pitchers were placed on the team. A select panel then added five legends to create a thirty-man team:—Warren Spahn (who finished #10 among pitchers), Christy Mathewson (#14 among pitchers), Lefty Grove (#18 among pitchers), Honus Wagner (#4 among shortstops), and Stan Musial (#11 among outfielders).

The nominees for the All-Century team were presented at the 1999 MLB All-Star Game at Fenway Park. Preceding Game 2 of the 1999 World Series, the members of the All-Century Team were revealed. Every living player named to the team attended.

Selected players

Pete Rose controversy
There was controversy over the inclusion in the All-Century Team of Pete Rose, who had been banned from baseball for life 10 years earlier. Some questioned Rose's presence on a team officially endorsed by Major League Baseball, but fans at the stadium gave him a standing ovation. During the on-field ceremony, which was emceed by Hall of Fame broadcaster Vin Scully, NBC Sports' Jim Gray questioned Rose about his refusal to admit to gambling on baseball.  Gray's interview became controversial, with some arguing that it was good journalism, while others objected that the occasion was an inappropriate setting for Gray's persistence.  After initially refusing to do so, Gray apologized a few days later.  On January 8, 2004, more than four years later, Rose admitted publicly to betting on baseball games in his 2004 autobiography My Prison Without Bars.

See also
Major League Baseball All-Time Team, a similar team chosen by the Baseball Writers' Association of America in 
Latino Legends Team
DHL Hometown Heroes (2006): the most outstanding player in the history of each MLB franchise, based on on-field performance, leadership quality and character value

List of MLB awards
Team of the century
National Baseball Hall of Fame and Museum

References

External links
The MLB All-Century Team
All-Century Team Vote Totals from ESPN.com
All-Century Team DVD from Amazon.com
All-Century Team Information from Baseball Almanac

1999 Major League Baseball season
Major League Baseball trophies and awards
History of Major League Baseball
Awards established in 1999
1999 establishments in the United States